STFC can stand for:

 Science and Technology Facilities Council, a UK research council created by the merger of the Council for the Central Laboratory of the Research Councils (CCLRC) and the Particle Physics and Astronomy Research Council (PPARC) on 1 April 2007
 Star Trek: First Contact, a 1996 film

STFC also stands for the names of many football clubs, most notably the professional clubs 

 Swindon Town F.C. 
 Shrewsbury Town F.C. 

It may also refer to one of the following other clubs:

In England:

 Sandhurst Town F.C.
 Sandiacre Town F.C.
 Sawbridgeworth Town F.C.
 Seaford Town F.C.
 Selby Town F.C.
 Sevenoaks Town F.C.
 Shefford Town F.C.
 Sherborne Town F.C.
 Shifnal Town F.C.
 Shirebrook Town F.C.
 Sleaford Town F.C.
 Slough Town F.C.
 Somersham Town F.C.
 Spennymoor Town F.C.
 Stafford Town F.C.
 Staines Town F.C.
 Steyning Town F.C.
 Stockport Town F.C.
 Stonehouse Town F.C.
 Stowmarket Town F.C.
 Stratford Town F.C.
 Swaffham Town F.C.

In Scotland:

 Scone Thistle F.C.
 Steins Thistle F.C.
 Strathspey Thistle F.C.

See also
 ST (disambiguation)